St Andrew's Church is the only congregation of the Church of Scotland in Portugal. It seeks to provide English-speaking Reformed Christian worship and pastoral care to a multinational community.

About 
An English-speaking congregation was established in Lisbon by the Free Church of Scotland in 1866; the present church building in Rua Arriaga in the historic Lapa district of Lisbon was constructed in 1899. The Church of Scotland services are conducted in English, but the building is also used by an Orthodox congregation.

The majority of the congregations of the Free Church of Scotland united with the United Presbyterian Church in 1900 creating the United Free Church of Scotland, which itself united with the Church of Scotland in 1929. The congregation was part of the Church of Scotland’s Presbytery of Spain & Portugal, which in 1974 became part of the Presbytery of Europe, which was renamed the International Presbytery in 2016.

Services are held at 11.00 am every Sunday. As of late March 2013 the congregation is without a permanent minister; the previous minister was the Rev Graham McGeoch, who was ordained and inducted to the congregation in December 2009 and moved to Edinburgh in early 2013.

See also
Church of Scotland
St. George's Church (the Church of England/Anglican congregation in Lisbon)

References

External links
St Andrew’s Church, Lisbon - official website

Church of Scotland churches
Churches in Lisbon
Presbyterian churches in Europe
Churches completed in 1899
Religious organizations established in 1866
1866 establishments in Portugal